is a Japanese manga series written and illustrated by Rokurou Ogaki. It was serialized on Shinchosha's Monthly Comic @Bunch manga website from July 2020 to December 2021 and published in three volumes.

Publication
Written and illustrated by Rokurou Ogaki, the series began serialization on Shinchosha's Monthly Comic @Bunch manga website on July 21, 2020. The series completed its serialization on December 21, 2021. The series' individual chapters were collected into three volumes.

At New York Comic Con 2021, Viz Media announced that they licensed the series for English publication.

Volume list

Reception
Christopher Farris from Anime News Network praised the action and culinary elements of the story, while criticizing the short length of the chapters, stating that it makes "characterization and content [feel] thin". Katherine Dacey from The Manga Critic criticized the story and artwork, calling the story "marred by lazy writing, paper-thin characterizations, and excessive fan service" and the artwork overly bland.

See also
 Unlimited Psychic Squad - An anime series whose manga adaptation is also written and illustrated by Rokurou Ogaki
 Akudama Drive - An anime series whose manga adaptation is also written and illustrated by Rokurou Ogaki

References

External links
 

Adventure anime and manga
Comedy anime and manga
Japanese webcomics
Seinen manga
Shinchosha manga
Viz Media manga
Webcomics in print